The Grigorovich I-2 was a biplane fighter aircraft of the Soviet Union, the first indigenous fighter to enter service in substantial numbers. Developed from the Grigorovich I-1, it first flew on 4 November 1924, piloted by A.I. Zhukov. The M-5 engine was a Soviet copy of the Liberty L-12.

Production of the redesigned I-2bis was 211 aircraft. Production was performed by Aviation Repair Plant No.3 in Smolensk.

Operators

 Soviet Air Forces

Specifications (I-2bis)

See also

External links
 D.Grigorovich page at www.aviation.ru
 Russian Aviation Museum 
 Venik's Aviation
 I-2 page at airwar.ru 

1920s Soviet and Russian fighter aircraft
Grigorovich aircraft
Aircraft first flown in 1924